Marvin E. Christianson Sr. (January 12, 1928 – March 8, 1969) was an American farmer and politician.

Born in Halstad, Minnesota, Christianson graduated from Halstad High School and was a dairy farmer and cattle dealer. Christianson served in the Minnesota House of Representatives as a Democrat from 1967 until his death in 1969. Christianson died of cancer at a hospital in Minneapolis, Minnesota. His wife Donna Jean Christianson succeeded her husband in a special election to the Minnesota House of Representatives.

References

1928 births
1969 deaths
People from Norman County, Minnesota
Farmers from Minnesota
Democratic Party members of the Minnesota House of Representatives
Deaths from cancer in Minnesota
20th-century American businesspeople
20th-century American politicians